This is a list of places on the Victorian Heritage Register in the City of Wodonga in Victoria, Australia. The Victorian Heritage Register is maintained by the Heritage Council of Victoria.

The Victorian Heritage Register, as of 2021, lists the following four state-registered places within the City of Wodonga:

References 

Wodonga
+
+